Kahn-e Ali Mohammad (also Romanized as Kahn-e ʿAlī Moḩammad) is a village in Zaboli Rural District, in the Central District of Mehrestan County, Sistan and Baluchestan Province, Iran. At the 2006 census, its population was 29, in 5 families.

References 

Populated places in Mehrestan County